The 47th Annual Martín Fierro Awards, presented by the Asociación de Periodistas de la Televisión y Radiofonía Argentina (APTRA), was held on June 18, 2017. During the ceremony, APTRA announced the Martín Fierro Awards for 2016 Argentine television and radio programs.

Awards
Winners are listed first and highlighted in boldface. Other nominations are listed in alphabetic order.

In Memoriam
As is tradition an in memoriam segment tribute was paid to those artists who had died between May 2016 and June 2017. The Argentine singer Abel Pintos sang his song "Sin principio ni fina", while images of the deceased artists was shown.

References

2016 in Argentine television
2017 in Argentina
2017 television awards
Argentina culture-related lists